Caleb Stan Ralph (born 10 September 1977 in Rotorua) is a New Zealand rugby union footballer. Ralph began his first-class career with Bay of Plenty, then moved to Auckland before heading to Canterbury. He started his Super Rugby career with the Chiefs in 1997, Blues (1998–99), Crusaders (2000–08) and a cameo role with the Queensland Reds (2011). He made his All Black debut while playing for Auckland in 1998.

After an absence from the national team of three years he was recalled in 2001, and was a regular member of the All Blacks throughout the 2002 and 2003 seasons, playing a total of 13 tests and scoring eight tries, including a hat-trick against Italy in 2002, and was a member of the New Zealand team during the 2003 Rugby World Cup. In 2006 he gained his 100th consecutive super rugby cap.

He made the New Zealand sevens side while still at Western Heights High School, Rotorua. He has since regularly represented New Zealand in Rugby sevens between 1996 and 2000 playing with Eric Rush and was a member of the gold medal-winning New Zealand team at the 1998 Commonwealth Games.

Ralph is second on the all-time list of Super Rugby try scorers, one try behind Doug Howlett, and  he still holds the record for consecutive Super Rugby appearances with 104. Ralph won the Canterbury Maori Trophy on 10 December 2005. In 2008 he signed up to play with Japanese club Fukuoka Sanix Blues. In 2010 he signed with the Australian club Sunshine Coast Stingrays. The following year in the final round of the regular 2011 Super Rugby season, Queensland Reds coach Ewen McKenzie recruited Ralph on a short term contract to combat the side's injury crisis in the outside backs. In Round 18 he took the field in the 65th minute as a substitute and equalled George Gregan's then-record of 136 Super Rugby games.

References

External links
 Crusaders profile
 
 

1977 births
Bay of Plenty rugby union players
Blues (Super Rugby) players
Canterbury rugby union players
Chiefs (rugby union) players
Commonwealth Games gold medallists for New Zealand
Crusaders (rugby union) players
Auckland rugby union players
Tasman rugby union players
Queensland Reds players
Living people
New Zealand international rugby union players
Māori All Blacks players
New Zealand rugby union players
Rugby union players from Rotorua
Rugby union centres
Rugby union wings
People educated at Western Heights High School
New Zealand international rugby sevens players
New Zealand male rugby sevens players
Commonwealth Games rugby sevens players of New Zealand
Commonwealth Games medallists in rugby sevens
Rugby sevens players at the 1998 Commonwealth Games
Medallists at the 1998 Commonwealth Games